Princess Royal Harbour is a part of King George Sound on the South coast of Western Australia, and harbour to Albany. On its northern shore is the Port of Albany. The name Princess Royal also appears in Albany in Princess Royal Fortress and Princess Royal Drive.

History
The first European to explore the waters was George Vancouver in HMS Discovery in September 1791; he named the harbour after Princess Charlotte Augusta Matilda, the first daughter and fourth child of King George III.

The harbour was surveyed by Matthew Flinders in 1802, Jules Dumont d'Urville in 1826, John Lort Stokes in 1848, and Henry Mangles Denham in 1858.

The harbour was less than two metres deep until it was dredged in 1901, and its entrance was dredged in 1952.

The Princess Royal Harbour was the departure location for a large convoy of Australian troops in November 1914.

The entrance to the harbour was named Ataturk Channel in 1985 (for Mustafa Kemal Atatürk); it is also known as Atatürk Entrance.

Ecology
Water quality has been tested and monitored over time.  The harbour is the location of a seagrass meadow of Posidonia.

References

External links

 
Albany, Western Australia
King George Sound
1791 establishments in Australia